Rudolph Sternad (October 6, 1906 – April 23, 1963) was an American art director and production designer. He was nominated for three Academy Awards in the category Best Art Direction. He was a frequent collaborator of producer-director Stanley Kramer, working with him on virtually all of the films that Kramer directed, and many famous ones that he only produced, such as High Noon, Cyrano de Bergerac, and The Men.

Selected filmography
Sternad was nominated for three Academy Awards for Best Art Direction:
 Judgment at Nuremberg (1961) (for which he was actually production designer; no art director was credited) 
 A Thousand and One Nights (1945)
 The Talk of the Town (1942)

Only one of the nominations (Judgment at Nuremberg) was for a Stanley Kramer film.

References

External links

1906 births
1963 deaths
American art directors